Raeside is a surname. Notable people with the surname include:

 Adrian Raeside (born 1957), cartoonist
 Jimmy Raeside (1880–1946), Scottish footballer
 Robbie Raeside (born 1972), Scottish footballer
 Thomas Raeside, Scottish footballer
 William Raeside (1892–1964), Scottish footballer and coach